Odontopsammodius is a genus of aphodiine dung beetles in the family Scarabaeidae. There are about 12 described species in Odontopsammodius.

Species
These 12 species belong to the genus Odontopsammodius:

 Odontopsammodius aenictus (Cartwright, 1955)
 Odontopsammodius armaticeps (Fall, 1932)
 Odontopsammodius atopus (Cartwright, 1955)
 Odontopsammodius brunneus (Balthasar, 1961)
 Odontopsammodius cameneni (Chalumeau, 1976)
 Odontopsammodius chipiririi (Cartwright, 1955)
 Odontopsammodius cruentus (Harold, 1867)
 Odontopsammodius decuiella (Chalumeau, 1979)
 Odontopsammodius fimbriatus (Cartwright, 1955)
 Odontopsammodius formosus (Cartwright, 1955)
 Odontopsammodius insulcatus (Schmidt, 1916)
 Odontopsammodius mapirii (Cartwright, 1955)

References

Further reading

 
 
 

Scarabaeidae
Articles created by Qbugbot